3/6 may refer to: 
 March 6 (month-day date notation) 
 3 June (day-month date notation) 
 3rd Battalion, 6th Marines